The , also known as  or , was a han or Japanese feudal domain in Kii Province. The domain spanned areas of present-day Wakayama and southern Mie prefectures, and had an income of 555,000 koku. The domain was administered from Wakayama Castle in present-day Wakayama, Wakayama Prefecture. The heads of the domain were drawn from the Kishu-Tokugawa clan, one of the Gosanke, or three branches of the Tokugawa clan. The domain was founded by Tokugawa Yorinobu, the tenth son of the shōgun Tokugawa Ieyasu, when he moved from Sunpu Domain in Suruga Province to Kii Province. The Kishū came to control the smaller adjacent Tanabe and Shingū domains. The Kishū Domain was noted for its production of the Kishū mikan, soy sauce, lacquerware, and high-grade oak charcoal during the Edo period, and leather and cotton production by the Meiji Restoration in 1868.

Under the abolition of the han system in July 1871 the domains of Kishū, Tanabe, and Shingū became Kishū Prefecture, Tanabe Prefecture, and Shingū Prefecture respectively, and in November of the same year the three prefectures were abolished with the creation of the present-day Mie and Wakayama prefectures.

Heads 
Toki Asano clan
Asano Yoshinaga
 Asano Nagaakira
Kishu-Tokugawa (Shinpan) (550,000 koku)
 Yorinobu
 Mitsusada
 Tsunanori
 Yorimoto
 Yoshimune - later became shogun
 Munenao
 Munemasa
 Shigenori
 Harusada
 Harutomi
 Nariyuki
 Narikatsu
 Yoshitomi (later became shogun Iemochi)
 Mochitsugu

Simplified family tree

 Tokugawa Ieyasu, 1st Tokugawa Shōgun (1543-1616; r. 1603-1605)
 I. Yorinobu, 1st Lord of Kishū (cr. 1619) (1602-1671; r. 1619-1667)
 II. Mitsusada, 2nd Lord of Kishū (1627-1705; r. 1667-1698)
 III. Tsunanori, 3rd Lord of Kishū (1665-1705; r. 1698-1705)
 IV. Yorimoto, 4th Lord of Kishū (1680-1705; r. 1705)
 V. Tokugawa Yoshimune, 5th Lord of Kishū, 8th Tokugawa Shōgun (1684-1751; Lord of Kishū: 1705-1716; Shōgun: 1716-1745)
 Munetada, 1st head of the Hitotsubashi-Tokugawa line (1721-1765)
Harusada, 2nd head of the Hitotsubashi-Tokugawa line (1751-1827)
 Tokugawa Ienari, 11th Tokugawa Shōgun (1773-1841; r. 1786-1841)
 Tokugawa Ieyoshi, 12th Tokugawa Shogun
 Tokugawa Iesada, 13th Tokugawa Shogun
 XI. Nariyuki, 11th Lord of Kishū (1801-1846; r. 1824-1846)
  XIII. Yoshitomi, 13th Lord of Kishū, 14th Tokugawa Shōgun (as Tokugawa Iemochi) (1846-1866; Lord: 1849-1858; Shōgun: 1858-1866)
  XII. Narikatsu, 12th Lord of Kishū (1820-1849; r. 1846-1849)
Narimasa, 4th head of the Tayasu-Tokugawa line (1779-1848)
Yoshiyori, 8th head of the Tayasu-Tokugawa line (1828-1876)
Yorimichi, 15th family head, 2nd Marquess (1872-1925; 15th family head: 1906-1925; 2nd Marquess: 1906-1925)
Yorisada, 16th family head, 3rd Marquess (1892-1954; 16th family head: 1925-1954; 3rd Marquess: 1925-1947)
 Yoriaki, 17th family head (1917-1958; 17th family head: 1954-1958)
Takako (b. 1926); m. Tokugawa (Aoyama) Tsuyoshi, 18th family head (b. 1924; 18th family head: 1958-1965)
 Noriko, 19th family head (b. 1956; 19th family head: 1965-present) 
Matsudaira Yorizumi, 1st Lord of Saijō (1641-1711)
 VI. Munenao, 6th Lord of Kishū (1682-1757; r. 1716-1757)
 VII. Munemasa, 7th Lord of Kishū (1720-1765; r. 1757-1765)
 VIII. Shigenori, 8th Lord of Kishū (1746-1829; r. 1765-1775)
Matsudaira Yorikata, 6th Lord of Saijō (1755-1806)
Matsudaira Yoriyuki, 8th Lord of Saijō (1785-1848)
Matsudaira Yorisatō, 9th Lord of Saijō (1809-1865)
  XIV. Mochitsugu, 14th Lord of Kishū and family head, 1st Marquess (1844-1906; Lord: 1858-1869; Governor: 1869-1871; Marquess: 1884)
  X. Harutomi, 10th Lord of Kishū (1771-1853; r. 1789-1824)
  IX. Harusada, 9th Lord of Kishū (1728-1789; r. 1775-1789)

References

Asano clan
Domains of Japan
Kishū-Tokugawa clan